USS Lannai (SP-242) was a motorboat which the United States Navy at least considered for service—and may have placed in service—during World War I as a patrol vessel.

Lannai received section patrol number 242, indicating that she was a privately owned motorboat which the U.S. Navy sometime between 1916 and 1918 at least considered for World War I service as a patrol vessel. No records have been found describing Lannais construction, acquisition, naval service (if any), or physical characteristics and performance; her records may have been lost or destroyed. She may have seen active naval service, although some boats which received section patrol numbers were never commissioned or, in some cases, never even acquired by the Navy, so it also is possible that the lack of records reflects a lack of naval service for Lannai.

References
 SP-242 Lannai at Navy History and Heritage Command Online Library of Selected Images: U.S. Navy Ships -- Listed by Hull Number: "SP" #s and "ID" #s -- World War I Era Patrol Vessels and other Acquired Ships and Craft numbered from SP-200 through SP-299
 SP-242 Lannai at NavSource Online: Section Patrol Craft (SP) and Civilian Vessels (ID) Index

Patrol vessels of the United States Navy
World War I patrol vessels of the United States